Vladislav Andreyevich Gavrikov (born 21 November 1995) is a Russian professional ice hockey defenceman for the Los Angeles Kings of the National Hockey League (NHL). He was drafted 159th overall by the Columbus Blue Jackets in the 2015 NHL Entry Draft.

Playing career
Gavrikov made his Kontinental Hockey League (KHL) debut with Lokomotiv Yaroslavl during the 2014–15 season.

With his development steadily progressing during his four senior years with Lokomotiv, his KHL rights were traded to powerhouse club SKA Saint Petersburg following the 2016–17 season. With the Columbus Blue Jackets hopeful of signing the Russian, he was earlier offered a contract and invited by the Blue Jackets to a tour of Columbus, Ohio. Despite his arrival on 27 June 2017, Gavrikov told the Blue Jackets that he had agreed to a two-year contract to remain in Russia with SKA.

In the 2018–19 season, Gavrikov scored a career-high 20 points in 60 games with SKA. Following a second consecutive conference final defeat to CSKA Moscow, Gavrikov was released from his expiring contract to sign a two-year, entry-level contract with the Columbus Blue Jackets on 13 April 2019.

Gavrikov scored his first career NHL goal on 15 November 2019. The goal was scored on goaltender Jake Allen and the St. Louis Blues. Gavrikov finished his rookie regular season with 18 points in 69 games. Gavrikov would score his first career NHL playoff goal during the 2020 Stanley Cup Playoffs against the Toronto Maple Leafs. He would finish the playoffs with 3 points in 10 games.

On 5 November 2020, Gavrikov signed a three-year, $8.4 million contract extension with the Blue Jackets.

On 1 March 2023, he was traded to the Los Angeles Kings along with Joonas Korpisalo for goaltender Jonathan Quick and two draft picks.

International play

Gavrikov has represented Russia in international play in the World Under-17 Challenge, World Under-18 Championships, World Junior Championships and World Championships. He was a member of the Olympic Athletes from Russia team at the 2018 Winter Olympics.

Career statistics

Regular season and playoffs

International

References

External links

1995 births
Living people
Columbus Blue Jackets draft picks
Columbus Blue Jackets players
Lokomotiv Yaroslavl players
Los Angeles Kings players
Russian ice hockey defencemen
SKA Saint Petersburg players
Sportspeople from Yaroslavl
Ice hockey players at the 2018 Winter Olympics
Olympic ice hockey players of Russia
Medalists at the 2018 Winter Olympics
Olympic medalists in ice hockey
Olympic gold medalists for Olympic Athletes from Russia